In Islamic history, Hurmala ibn Kahil al-Asadi was an archer at the Umayyad side at the Battle of Karbala. He was the killer of Ali al-Asghar ibn Husayn, the great-grandchild of Muhammad, on 10 October, 61 AH (680 CE).

When Imam Al-Husayn had lost all hope against the enemy at the Battle of Karbala, he came out riding on a horse and asked for water for his six months old child Ali al-Asghar who was dying of thirst. Hurmala sent a three-headed arrow flying into the little child's throat.

He was later captured and killed by the forces of Mukhtar al-Thaqafi.

See also
 Shimr
 Battle of Karbala

References

Murderers of children
7th-century Arabs
Battle of Karbala